= Marluce Dias da Silva =

Brazilian television executive

- Born: November 30, 1950 (age 74); Recife, Pernambuco
- Occupation: Television executive

Marluce Dias da Silva (born in November 30, 1950) is a Brazilian television executive. She became director general of TV Globo in January 1999 and held the position until September 2002.

In 2001, she was listed by Fortune magazine as one of the 50 most powerful women in the business world outside the United States. Silvia appeared in 37th place.
